Cape Farrar is a cape located along the Boothia Peninsula of the Kitikmeot Region near Taloyoak in the Canadian province of Nunavut, approximately 2,900 km northwest of Ottawa.

Geography
James Ross Strait and the St. Roch Basin separate the cape and Boothia Peninsula from King William Island to the west. The community of Taloyoak lies to the northeast of the cape.

Name
Cape Farrar is named after Sergeant Frederick Sleigh Farrar, RCMP. Sgt. F.S. Farrar was born at 37 Gresford Avenue, Liverpool, England in 1901, and was a Royal Naval cadet when he emigrated to Canada in 1929 and joined the RCMP in that same year. Farrar spent more than 10 years on the schooner RCMPV St. Roch. He was among the first to circumnavigate the North American continent, having gone through the Northwest Passage with Inspector Henry Larsen, serving as skipper. Farrar authored a book entailing his journeys entitled Arctic Assignment: The Story of the St. Roch which was published shortly after his death in 1955.

References

Peninsulas of Kivalliq Region
Farrar